The 2023 Nigerian House of Representatives elections were held on 25 February 2023 where voters  elected members of the House of Representatives using first-past-the-post voting in all 360 federal constituencies. The last regular House elections for all districts were in 2019.

Other federal elections, including the Senate elections and the presidential election, held on the same date while state elections will be held two weeks afterwards on 18 March. The winners of these House elections will serve beginning in the 10th Nigerian National Assembly. The APC have held a majority in the House of Representatives since the 2015 elections and solidified that majority in 2019.

Background
After the 2015–2019 House of Representatives term led by Speaker Yakubu Dogara (Peoples Democratic Party) and with a slight All Progressives Congress majority, the 2019 elections were categorized by a large shift back towards the APC. As in the Senate, the APC solidified its majority after nearly losing it due to defections in 2018.

At the opening of the 9th Nigeria National Assembly, Femi Gbajabiamila (APC-Surulere I) was elected as Speaker and Ahmed Idris Wase (APC-Wase) became Deputy Speaker as the party avoided the internal struggles that led Dogara and Yusuf Sulaimon Lasun to take those offices in 2015. On the other hand, the emergence of PDP leadership was immensely contentious as the party nominated Kingsley Chinda (PDP-Obio/Akpor) to become the House Minority Leader but Gbajabiamila named Ndudi Elumelu (PDP-Aniocha/Oshimili) to the position; the dispute over Elumelu's leadership lasted nearly two years. During the first half of the 2019–2023 term, the APC expanded its majority through the defections of over a dozen MHRs but in the second half of the term, both major parties were hit by several defections to the other side and to minor parties as party primaries for 2023 neared. The defections to minor parties even lead to speculation on the possibility of no party gaining a majority in 2023.

From the perspective of the APC, analysts viewed the 9th House as a stark change from the legislature versus executive disputes that were commonplace during the 8th House but critics mocked the body as a rubber stamp that practically acted as an arm of the executive branch. 
In terms of specific major bills, the House was noted for passing the Sexual Harassment Bill in July 2020, the Finance Bill 2020 in December 2020, the Petroleum Industry Bill in July 2021, a new Electoral Act in January 2022, dozens of constitutional amendments in March 2022, and an Electoral Act amendment in May 2022. On the other hand, it was criticized for voting down constitutional amendments for mandating women inclusion in government and diaspora voting along with the continuous refusal to address gender equality and rampant misappropriation of public funds.

Retirements
In total, 46 members of the House of Representatives—including one A member, one ADP member, 16 APC members, two APGA members, three LP members, 22 PDP members, and one SDP member—opted not to run for re-election, 36 of whom are seeking another office.

Abakaliki/Izzi (Ebonyi State): Sylvester Ogbaga (PDP) is retired to run for the governorship of Ebonyi State.
Aguata (Anambra State): Chukwuma Michael Umeoji (APC) is retired to run for senator for Anambra South.
Akamkpa/Biase (Cross River State): Daniel Effiong Asuquo (LP) is initially retired to unsuccessfully run for the governorship of Cross River State then run for senator for Cross River South.
Akinyele/Lagelu (Oyo State): Oluokun Akintola (APC) is retiring.
Arochukwu/Ohafia (Abia State): Uko Nkole (PDP) is retired to unsuccessfully run for senator for Abia North.
Askira-Uba/Hawul (Borno State): Haruna Mshelia (APC) is retiring.
Barkin Ladi/Riyom (Plateau State): Simon Mwadkwon (PDP) is retired to run for senator for Plateau North.
Bauchi (Bauchi State): Yakubu Shehu Abdullahi (APC) is retired to run for senator for Bauchi South.
Chanchaga (Niger State): Mohammed Umar Bago (APC) is retired to run for the governorship of Niger State.
Dass/Bogoro/Tafawa Balewa (Bauchi State): Yakubu Dogara (PDP) is retiring.
Degema/Bonny (Rivers State): Farah Dagogo (PDP) is retired to unsuccessfully run for the governorship of Rivers State.
Dikwa/Mafa/Konduga (Borno State): Ibrahim Mohammed Bukar (APC) is retiring.
Ebonyi/Ohaukwu (Ebonyi State): Chukwuma Nwazunku (PDP) is retired to run for the governorship of Ebonyi State.
Eket/Onna/Esit Eket/Ibeno (Akwa Ibom State): Patrick Ifon (PDP) is retired to unsuccessfully run for senator for Akwa Ibom South.
Ekiti South West/Ikere/Ise/Orun (Ekiti State): Raphael Adeyemi Adaramodu (APC) is retired to run for senator for Ekiti South.
Ekiti/Isin/Irepodun/Oke-ero (Kwara State): Raheem Olawuyi (APC) is retired to unsuccessfully run for senator for Kwara South.
Esan North East/Esan South East (Edo State): Sergius Ogun (PDP) is retiring.
Etinan/Nsit Ibom/Nsit Ubium (Akwa Ibom State): Onofiok Luke (PDP) is retired to unsuccessfully run for the governorship of Akwa Ibom State.
Ezza North/Ishielu (Ebonyi State): Edwin Anayo (PDP) is retired to run for the governorship of Ebonyi State.
Funtua/Dandume (Katsina State): Mohammed Muntari Dandutse (APC) is retired to run for senator for Katsina South.
Ikot Abasi/Mkpat Enin/Eastern Obolo (Akwa Ibom State): Francis Uduyok (PDP) is retired to unsuccessfully run for senator for Akwa Ibom South.
Ile-oluji/Okeigbo/Odigbo (Ondo State): Mayowa Akinfolarin (APC) is retired to unsuccessfully run for senator for Ondo South.
Illela/Gwadabawa (Sokoto State): Abdullahi Balarabe Salame (PDP) is retired to unsuccessfully run for the governorship of Sokoto State.
Iseyin/Kajola/Iwajowa/Itesiwaju (Oyo State): Shina Peller (A) is retired to run for senator for Oyo North.
Isiala Ngwa North/Isiala Ngwa South (Abia State): Darlington Nwokocha (LP) is retired to run for senator for Abia Central.
Isoko South/Isoko North (Delta State): Ogor Okuweh (PDP) is retiring.
Jema’a/Sanga (Kaduna State): Shehu Nicholas Garba (PDP) is retired to run for senator for Kaduna South.
Kabba/Bunu/Ijumu (Kogi State): Tajudeen Yusuf (PDP) is retired to run for senator for Kogi West.
Kano Municipal (Kano State): Sha'aban Ibrahim Sharada (ADP) is retired to unsuccessfully run for the governorship of Kano State.
Karim Lamido/Lau/Ardo-Kola (Taraba State): Danladi Baido (SDP) is retired to run for the governorship of Taraba State.
Konshisha/Vandeikya (Benue State): Herman Hembe (LP) is retired to run for the governorship of Benue State.
Mayo Belwa/Toungo/Jada/Ganye (Adamawa State): Abdulrazak Namdas (APC) is retired to unsuccessfully run for the governorship of Adamawa State.
Monguno/Marte/Nganzai (Borno State): Mohammed Tahir Monguno (APC) is retired to run for senator for Borno North.
Njikoka/Dunukofia/Anaocha (Anambra State): Dozie Nwankwo (APGA) is retired to run for senator for Anambra Central.
Nnewi North/Nnewi South/Ekwusigo (Anambra State): Chris Emeka Azubogu (APGA) is retired to run for senator for Anambra South.
Oredo (Edo State): Omoregie Ogbeide-Ihama (PDP) is retired to run for senator for Edo South.
Oru East/Orsu/Orlu (Imo State): Jerry Alagbaoso (PDP) is retired to run for senator for Imo West.
Port Harcourt II (Rivers State): Chinyere Igwe (PDP) is retiring.
Ringim/Taura (Jigawa State): Ado Sani Kiri (APC) is retiring.
Ukwa East/Ukwa West (Abia State): Uzoma Nkem-Abonta (PDP) is retired to run for senator for Abia South.
Umuahia North/Umuahia South/Ikwuano (Abia State): Samuel Onuigbo (APC) is retired to run for senator for Abia Central.
Uyo/Uruan/Nsit Atai/Ibesikpo Asutan (Akwa Ibom State): Michael Enyong (PDP) is retired to run for the governorship of Akwa Ibom State.
Wukari/Ibi (Taraba State): Usman Danjuma Shiddi (APC) is retired to run for senator for Taraba South.
Yenagoa/Kolokuna/Opokuma (Bayelsa State): Stephen Azaiki (PDP) is retiring.
Zango/Baure (Katsina State): Nasiru Sani (APC) is retired to run for senator for Katsina North.

Deaths
Two seats will be vacant on the day of the election due to deaths, none of which will be filled until the next House.

Oron/Mbo/Okobo/Udung Uko/Urue Offong/Oruko (Akwa Ibom State): Nse Ekpenyong died on 23 April 2022.
Egor/Ikpoba-Okha (Edo State): Jude Ise-Idehen died on 1 July 2022.

Incumbents withdrew

From primary elections 
Eleven members of the House of Representatives withdrew from primary elections. However, nine of the members later decamped from their original party with eight winning the nomination of their new party with one member's current status unknown.

Bakura/Maradun (Zamfara State): Ahmed Bakura Muhammad (then-APC) withdrew from the primary election. However, Muhammad defected to the PDP and became its House nominee.
Bungudu/Maru (Zamfara State): Shehu Ahmed (then-APC) withdrew from the primary election. However, Ahmed defected to the PDP and became its House nominee.
Gunmi/Bukkuyum (Zamfara State): Sulaiman Abubakar Mahmud Gumi (then-APC) withdrew from the primary election. However, Mahmud Gumi defected to the PDP and became its House nominee.
Gusau/Tsafe (Zamfara State): Kabiru Amadu (then-APC) withdrew from the primary election. However, Amadu defected to the PDP and became its House nominee.
Ikeduru/Mbaitoli (Imo State): Henry Nwawuba (then-PDP) withdrew from the primary election. However, Nwawuba defected to APGA and became its House nominee.
Ikono/Ini (Akwa Ibom State): Emmanuel Ukpong-udo (then-PDP) withdrew from the primary election. However, Ukpong-udo defected to the YPP and became its House nominee.
Kaura Namoda/Birnin Magaji (Zamfara State): Sani Umar Dan-Galadima (then-APC) withdrew from the primary election. However, Dan-Galadima defected to the PDP and became its (disputed) House nominee.
Kosofe (Lagos State): Rotimi Agunsoye (APC) withdrew from the primary election.
Misau/Dambam (Bauchi State): Ibrahim Makama Misau (PDP) withdrew from the primary election.
Obingwa/Ugwunagbo/Osisioma (Abia State): Solomon Adaelu (then-PDP) withdrew from the primary election. However, Adaelu defected to APGA and became its House nominee.
Shinkafi/Zurmi (Zamfara State): Bello Hassan Shinkafi (then-APC) withdrew from the primary election. However, Hassan Shinkafi defected to the PDP and became its House nominee.

From nomination 
One incumbent withdrew from their nomination.

Zaki (Bauchi State): Muhammad Auwal Jatau (PDP) won renomination but withdrew from the nomination to become the PDP nominee for the deputy governorship of Bauchi State.

In primary elections 
In total, 64 members of the House of Representatives—including 45 APC members and 19 PDP members—lost in primary elections. After the primary defeats, 17 of the members defected to new parties with ten members then winning the House nomination of the new party. Another three of the members defected to new parties then won the nomination of the new party for a different office.

Abeokuta South (Ogun State): Lanre Edun (APC) lost renomination to Afolabi Afuape.
Aboh Mbaise/Ngor Okpala (Imo State): Bede Eke (PDP) lost renomination to Albert Chibuzo Agulanna.
Ado-Odo/Ota (Ogun State): Jimoh Ojugbele (APC) lost renomination to Tunji Akinosi.
Agege (Lagos State): Samuel Babatunde Adejare (APC) lost renomination to Wale Ahmed.
Ajeromi/Ifelodun (Lagos State): Taiwo Kolawole (APC) lost renomination to Kalejaiye Adeboye Paul.
Akoko South East/Akoko South West (Ondo State): Adejoro Adeogun (APC) lost renomination to Gboyega Adefarati.
Akure North/Akure South (Ondo State): Mayokun Lawson-Alade (APC) lost renomination to Aderin Adesida.
Aninri/Awgu/Oji River (Enugu State): Toby Okechukwu (PDP) lost renomination to Anayo Onwuegbu.
Apa/Agatu (Benue State): Godday Samuel (APC) lost nomination to Adama Joseph Adama.
Apapa (Lagos State): Mufutau Egberongbe (APC) lost renomination to Adesola Adedayo.
Arewa/Dandi (Kebbi State): Umar Abdullahi Kamba (APC) lost renomination to Garba Rabiu Kamba. However, Abdullahi Kamba later defected to the PDP and became its House nominee.
Awka North/Awka South (Anambra State): Sam Onwuaso (PDP) lost renomination to Emeka Vincent Igwe. Onwuaso later defected to the LP but lost nomination in his new party as well; he then returned to the PDP.
Babura/Garki (Jigawa State): Musa Muhammadu Adamu Fagen-Gawo (APC) lost renomination. Adamu Fagen-Gawo later defected to the PDP.
Badagry (Lagos State): Babatunde Hunpe (APC) lost renomination to Sesi Oluwaseun Whingan.
Bakori/Danja (Katsina State): Hamza Dalhatu Batagarawa (APC) lost renomination to Usman Banye.
Batsari/Safana/Danmusa (Katsina State): Ahmed Dayyabu Safana (APC) lost renomination to Abdulkadir Ahmed Zakka.
Bebeji/Kiru (Kano State): Ali Datti-Yako (APC) lost nomination to Muhammad Sanusi Sa'id Kiru.
Bindawa/Mani (Katsina State): Aminu Ashiru Mani (APC) lost renomination to Ahmed Yusuf Doro. Ashiru Mani later defected to the PDP.
Boluwaduro/Ifedayo/Illa (Osun State): Olufemi Fakeye (APC) lost renomination to Obawale Simeon Adebisi.
Bosso/Paikoro (Niger State): Shehu Barwa Beji (APC) lost renomination to Yusuf Kure Baraje.
Bunza/Birnin Kebbi/Kalgo (Kebbi State): Muhammad Bello Yakubu (PDP) lost nomination to Abba Bello Mohammed. Yakubu later defected to the APC.
Buruku (Benue State): Kpam Sokpo (PDP) lost nomination to Agba Terkaa. However, Sokpo later defected to the LP and became its House nominee.
Daura/Sandamu/Mai’adua (Katsina State): Fatahu Muhammad (APC) lost renomination to Aminu Jamo.
Dutsin-Ma/Kurfi (Katsina State): Armaya'u Abdulkadir (APC) lost nomination to Aminu Balele. However, Abdulkadir later defected to the NNPP and became its House nominee.
Edu/Moro/Pategi (Kwara State): Ahmed Abubakar Ndakene (APC) lost renomination to Ahmed Saba.
Egbado North/Imeko-Afon (Ogun State): Olaifa Jimoh Aremu (APC) lost nomination to Gboyega Nasir Isiaka.
Egbado South/Ipokia (Ogun State): Kolawole Lawal (APC) lost nomination. However, Aremu later defected to the APM and became its House nominee.
Egbado South/Ipokia (Ogun State): Olajide Olatubosun (APC) lost nomination to Kareem Tajudeen Abisodun. However, Olatubosun later defected to the LP and became its House nominee.
Esan Central/Esan South/Igueben (Edo State): Joe Edionwele (PDP) lost renomination to Felix Ehiguese Akhabue.
Ethiope East/Ethiope West (Delta State): Ben Igbakpa (PDP) lost nomination to Erhiatake Ibori-Suenu. However, Igbakpa later defected to the NNPP and became its House nominee.
Etsako East/Etsako West Etsako Central (Edo State): Johnson Oghuma (APC) lost renomination to Sunday Anamero Dekeri.
Ezeagu/Udi (Enugu State): Dennis Oguerinwa Amadi (PDP) lost nomination to Festus Uzor. Amadi later defected to the LP and became its (disputed) senatorial nominee for Enugu West.
Fika/Fune (Yobe State): Abubakar Yerima Idris (APC) lost renomination to Mohammed Aliyu Sakin Kasuwa.
Gabasawa/Gezawa (Kano State): Nasiru Abduwa Gabasawa (APC) lost nomination to Mahmoud Muhammad Santsi. Abduwa Gabasawa later defected to the PDP.
Guyuk/Shelleng (Adamawa State): Gibeon Goroki (PDP) lost renomination to Kobis Ari Thimnu.
Gwaram (Jigawa State): Yusuf Shittu Galambi (APC) lost renomination to Isah Idris Gwaram. However, Shittu Galambi later defected to the NNPP and became its House nominee.
Gwer East/Gwer West (Benue State): Mark Gbillah (PDP) lost nomination to Emmanuel Ukaa. Gbillah first defected to the NNPP then to the LP and became its senatorial nominee for Benue North-West.
Ido/Osi, Moba/Ilejeme (Ekiti State): Ibrahim Kunle Olanrewaju (APC) lost renomination to Akinlayo Kolawole.
Ifako/Ijaiye (Lagos State): James Owolabi (APC) lost renomination to Benjamin Adeyemi Olabinjo.
Ijebu Ode/Odogbolu/Ijebu North East (Ogun State): Kolapo Korede Osunsanya (APC) lost renomination to Olufemi Adeleke Ogunbanwo.
Ijero/Ekiti West/Efon (Ekiti State): Omowumi Olubunmi Ogunlola (APC) lost renomination to Biodun Omoleye.
Ikole/Oye (Ekiti State): Peter Owolabi (APC) lost renomination to Akin Rotimi.
Ikom/Boki (Cross River State): Chris Ngoro Agibe (PDP) lost renomination to Attah Ochinke.
Ikot Ekpene/Essien Udim/Obot Akara (Akwa Ibom State): Nsikak Ekong (PDP) lost renomination to Idongesit Ntekpere.
Irepo/Olurunsogo/Orelope (Oyo State): Olumide Ojerinde (APC) lost renomination to Olaide Muhammed. However, Ojerinde later defected to A and became its House nominee.
Irepodun/Olurunda/Osogbo/Orolu (Osun State): Olubukola Oyewo (APC) lost renomination to Abosede Kasumu Ogo-Oluwa.
Itu/Ibiono Ibom (Akwa Ibom State): Henry Archibong (PDP) lost renomination to Ime Okon.
Katsina (Katsina State): Salisu Iro Isansi (APC) lost renomination to Sani Aliyu Danlami.
Kazaure/Roni/Gwiwa/Yankwashi (Jigawa State): Muhammed Gudaji Kazaure (APC) lost renomination to Muktar Muhammed Zanna. However, Gudaji Kazaure later defected to the ADC and became its House nominee.
Keffi/Karu/Kokona (Nasarawa State): Jonathan Gaza Gbefwi (APC) lost nomination to Koro Auta. However, Gbefwi later defected to the SDP and became its House nominee.
Lafia/Obi (Nasarawa State): Abubakar Sarki Dahiru (APC) lost nomination to Mohammed Al-Makura. However, Dahiru later defected to the SDP and became its House nominee.
Malumfashi/Kafur (Katsina State): Babangida Ibrahim (APC) lost renomination. Ibrahim later defected to the NNPP and became its senatorial nominee for Katsina South.
Matazu/Musawa (Katsina State): Ahmed Usman Liman (APC) lost renomination to Abdullahi Aliyu.
Mikang/Qua’an/Pan/Shedam (Plateau State): Komsol Longgap (APC) lost renomination to John Dafa’an.
Mushin II (Lagos State): Bolaji Ayinla (APC) lost renomination to Toyin Fayinka.
Nkokwa East/Ndokwa West/Ukwuani (Delta State): Ossai Nicholas Ossai (PDP) lost renomination to Nnamdi Ezechi.
Nsukka/Igbo-Eze South (Enugu State): Pat Asadu (PDP) lost renomination to Vita Abba.
Odo-Otin/Boripe/Ifelodun (Osun State): Olalekan Rasheed Afolabi (APC) lost renomination to Moshood Adekunle Oluawo.
Ogbia (Bayelsa State): Azibapu Fred Obua (PDP) lost renomination to Ebiyun Turner.
Okpe/Sapele/Uvwie (Delta State): Efe Afe (PDP) lost renomination to Evelyn Omavowan Oboro.
Shiroro/Rafi/Munya (Niger State): Umar Saidu Doka (APC) lost renomination to Isma'il Musa Modibo.
Takuma/Donga/Ussa (Taraba State): Rima Kwewum (PDP) lost renomination to Istifanus Gbana.
Toro (Bauchi State): Umar Muda Lawal (APC) lost renomination to Ismail Haruna Dabo.
Yola North/Yola South/Girei (Adamawa State): Jafaru Suleiman Ribadu (PDP) lost renomination to Salihu Mohammed Abba Girei.

Results

National

Summary

Principal officers' races

Abia State

Adamawa State

Akwa Ibom State

Anambra State

Bauchi State

Bayelsa State

Benue State

Borno State

Cross River State

Delta State

Ebonyi State

Edo State

Ekiti State

Enugu State

Federal Capital Territory

Gombe State

Imo State

Jigawa State

Kaduna State

Kano State

Katsina State

Kebbi State

Kogi State

Kwara State

Lagos State

Nasarawa State

Niger State

Ogun State

Ondo State

Osun State

Oyo State

Plateau State

Rivers State

Sokoto State

Taraba State

Yobe State

Zamfara State

Notes

References 

House
 
2023 in Nigeria
February 2023 events in Africa
Election and referendum articles with incomplete results